Peter Carter may refer to:

 Peter Carter (academic lawyer) (1921–2004), Fellow of Wadham College, Oxford
 Piero Lulli (1929–1991) actor credited as Peter Carter
 Peter Carter (author) (1929–1999), British children's writer
 Peter Carter (director) (1933–1982), Canadian film and television director
 Peter Carter (diplomat) (1956–2014), British Ambassador to Estonia 2007 to 2012
 Peter Carter (tennis) (1964–2002), Australian tennis player and coach
 Peter Carter (nurse), British nurse
 Pete Carter (1938–2011), British trade unionist
 Peter Carter (footballer) (born 1959), Australian rules footballer
 Peter J. Carter (1845–1886), American politician in Virginia

See also
 Peter Carter-Ruck (1914–2003), English lawyer
 Peter Karter (1922–2010), American nuclear engineer